Robert Louis Krulwich (born August 5, 1947) is an American radio and television journalist who currently serves as a science correspondent for NPR and was a co-host of the program Radiolab.  He has worked as a full-time employee of  ABC, CBS, National Public Radio, and Pacifica. He has done assignment pieces for ABC's Nightline and World News Tonight, as well as PBS's Frontline, NOVA, and NOW with Bill Moyers.  TV Guide called him "the most inventive network reporter in television", and New York Magazine wrote that he's "the man who simplifies without being simple."

Background
Krulwich received his bachelor's degree in U.S. history from Oberlin College in 1969 and his Juris Doctor degree from Columbia Law School in 1974. Just two months later, he abandoned his pursuit of a law career to cover the Watergate hearings for Pacifica Radio. In 1976, he became Washington bureau chief for Rolling Stone.

From 1978 to 1985, he was the business and economics correspondent for NPR. Among other creative efforts, he recorded an opera called "Rato Interesso" to explain interest rates. He went on to host the PBS arts series Edge.

In 1984, he joined CBS and appeared regularly on This Morning, 48 Hours, and Nightwatch with Charlie Rose. During the Gulf War, he co-anchored the CBS program America Tonight.  In 1994, he joined ABC.

In 1992, Krulwich appeared as a guest on the first episode of The Tonight Show with Jay Leno. Critic Tom Shales panned Krulwich's appearance, describing him as "the Big Bird of economics." 

Annually through the 1990s, he hosted a semi-fictional year-in-review program called Backfire for NPR. In 1995, at the invitation of President and Mrs. Clinton, the group that collaborates with Krulwich to produce Backfire performed at the White House.

In 1999, he hosted an eight-part prime-time series for ABC Nightline called Brave New World (which frequently featured his friends, They Might Be Giants, as musical guests).

In 2004, Krulwich became the host and managing editor of the innovative PBS science program NOVA scienceNOW.  The show often tackled science stories considered too complex for television, sometimes using cartoons and musical production numbers to illustrate abstract concepts.  In 2005, Krulwich re-established a relationship with NPR, where he made regular contributions to several programs on science topics, while continuing to produce occasional segments for ABC News. By early 2006, with several projects going at once, Krulwich decided to end his work on NOVA scienceNOW after only five episodes.

Krulwich regularly moderates discussions on scientific topics at the 92nd Street Y in New York City. His presentations at the YMHA have featured such prominent scientists as Brian Greene and James D. Watson.

He is a regular correspondent on the PBS investigative series Frontline.  Krulwich substitutes for the hosts of NPR's magazine shows, and from mid-2004 to January 2020 he co-hosted the Radiolab program with Jad Abumrad.

Retirement 
On December 5, 2019, Krulwich announced via the Radiolab email newsletter that he would be retiring from Radiolab, though specifying it would not be immediate. His last episode aired on January 30, 2020.

Awards and honors
In his Frontline role, he has won an Alfred I. duPont–Columbia University Award for his coverage of campaign finance in the 1992 U.S. Presidential campaign; a national Emmy Award for his investigation of privacy on the Internet, High Stakes in Cyberspace; and a George Polk Award for an hour on the savings and loan scandal. His ABC special on Barbie also won an Emmy.

He has received multitude other awards for his reporting, including the Extraordinary Communicator Award from the National Cancer Institute in 2000, four consecutive Gainsbrugh Awards from the Economics Broadcasting Association, and the American Association for the Advancement of Science Excellence in Television Award in 2001 for a NOVA special on the human genome. He also won the 2001 AAAS Science Journalism Award for his NOVA special, Cracking the Code of Life.

TV Guide named Krulwich to its "all-star reporting team." He was included in Esquire's "Registry of Outstanding Men and Women" in 1989.

In 2010, WNYC received a Peabody Award for Radiolab.

Personal life
Krulwich lives in New York City and Shelter Island, New York, with his wife, Tamar Lewin, a national reporter for The New York Times. They have two children: Jesse (who graduated from Earlham College in 2007), and Nora Ann (Bowdoin College, Class of 2011).  The couple was featured in Act 2 of Episode 226 ("Reruns") of the Chicago Public Radio program This American Life, recounting their separate (and divergent) accounts of an event in their lives.

Controversies
Following criticism over a September 24, 2012, Radiolab segment on yellow rain and the Hmong people in which he interviewed Kao Kalia Yang and her uncle, Eng Yang, an official documenter of the Hmong experience for the Thai government.  Amongst other statements regarding the controversy, Yang stated: "Everybody in the show had a name, a profession, institutional affiliation except Eng Yang, who was identified as “Hmong guy,” and me, “his niece.” The fact that I am an award-winning writer was ignored. The fact that my uncle was an official radio man and documenter of the Hmong experience to the Thai government during the war was absent."  Krulwich issued an apology on September 30, 2012, writing, "I now can hear that my tone was oddly angry. That's not acceptable -- especially when talking to a man who has suffered through a nightmare in Southeast Asia that was beyond horrific."

References

External links
 Krulwich radio archive
 NOVA Science NOW
 ABC News Bio
 NPR Bio
 Radiolab

American television journalists
NPR personalities
Columbia Law School alumni
Oberlin College alumni
Writers from New York (state)
Living people
ABC News personalities
American male journalists
1947 births